List of African-American newspapers in Washington may refer to:

 List of African-American newspapers in Washington (state)
 List of African-American newspapers in Washington, D.C.